John H. Collins (December 31, 1889 – October 31, 1918)  was an American writer and director of the silent film era. He married film actress Viola Dana. His career was cut short when he died at the age of 28 due to the 1918 influenza epidemic. During his career which began in 1914, he directed more than 40 features and film shorts, and wrote the scenario for over a dozen more features. His 1917 film The Girl Without a Soul was selected by the National Film Registry to be preserved by the Library of Congress. His final works were shown posthumously in 1919.

Partial filmography
 Cohen's Luck (1915)
 Gladiola (1915)
 The Man Who Could Not Sleep (1915)
 Children of Eve (1915)
 On Dangerous Paths (1915)
 The Flower of No Man's Land (1916)
 The Light of Happiness (1916)
 The Gates of Eden (1916)
 The Innocence of Ruth (1916)
 The Cossack Whip (1916)
 God's Law and Man's (1917)
 A Wife by Proxy (1917)Rosie O'Grady (1917)
 Lady Barnacle (1917)
 Aladdin's Other Lamp (1917)
 The Girl Without a Soul (1917)
 Blue Jeans (1917)
 The Winding Trail (1918)
 A Weaver of Dreams (1918)
 Riders of the Night (1918)
 Opportunity (1918)
 Flower of the Dusk (1918)
 The Gold Cure (1919)
 Satan Junior'' (1919)

References

External links
John H. Collins at IMDb.com

1918 deaths
1889 births
American film directors
Deaths from the Spanish flu pandemic in New York (state)